Rupa Asha Huq (born 2 April 1972) is a British Labour MP, columnist and academic. Elected as the Labour Member of Parliament (MP) for Ealing Central and Acton at the 2015 general election, she was formerly a senior lecturer in sociology at Kingston University.

Early life
Huq was born in Queen Charlotte's Hospital, Hammersmith, London, England, and grew up on Brunswick Road, Ealing. Huq's father, Muhammad Huq (also known as Abedul), and mother, Rowshan Ara Huq (also known as Dulali Biswas), moved to Britain in 1962 from East Pakistan (since 1971 Bangladesh). Huq's father came from Maksedpur in Pabna city and her mother from Kuthipara in Pabna city. Huq's father was training to become an actuary for Prudential, but gave that up to open an Indian restaurant in Soho, London. After the recession of the early 1990s, the council did not renew the restaurant's lease so the business folded. He opened another restaurant in Harrow and later retired.

She attended Montpelier Primary School in Ealing. In 1980, at the age of eight, Huq was featured in the BBC Schools programme Look and Read when the programme visited the school. For her secondary education she attended the independent girls' school Notting Hill and Ealing High School.

In 1993, she graduated with an upper second in Political and Social Sciences and Law from Newnham College, Cambridge, for a BA. In 1999, she completed a PhD in cultural studies with a thesis on youth culture at the University of East London, comparing young people in East London and the Alsace region of France. This included being a post-graduate at Strasbourg II University in France, during which time she also worked at the European Parliament for the Labour Party, shadowing Labour MEP Carole Tongue. In October 2017, Huq told Sky News that she had been sexually harassed by a male MEP at this time.

Teaching career
In 1998, Huq moved to Manchester. From 1998 to 2004, she was a lecturer at the  University of Manchester, during which time she held a Leverhulme Trust Fellowship.

From September 2004 until 2015, Huq was a senior lecturer in Sociology and Criminology at Kingston University in the Faculty of Arts and Social Sciences. She has also taught Media and Cultural Studies.

Writing and media career
Huq has contributed to Tribune, The Guardian, New Statesman, Progress magazine and The Times Higher Education Supplement. Huq's research specialism has chiefly been youth culture and pop music. She has a particular interest in David Bowie.

In 2006, her book Beyond Subculture: youth, pop and identity in a post-colonial world on these themes was published. It was subsequently one of five titles shortlisted for the 2007 British Sociological Association Philip Abrams Memorial Prize. Huq was a contributor to the 2011 book What Next for Labour? Ideas for a new generation, published by Queensferry Publishing. In June 2013, her second book Making Sense of Suburbia through Popular Culture was published. Also in 2013, her third book On the Edge: The Contested Cultures of English Suburbia After 7/7 was published.

Huq has appeared on Channel S and Bangla TV as well as Channel 4 News and BBC News 24. On radio, she has been on the Today programme on BBC Radio 4, BBC Radio 5 Live and BBC Asian Network.

Huq says that she has been a part-time DJ, saying in 2004, "I first started DJing for a hospital radio station when I was about 17 and now I DJ in clubs and bars in Manchester".

Early political career

Huq was a researcher for Tony Banks and Patricia Hewitt. In 2004, she stood as a candidate for Labour in the European Parliament election in North West England.

In 2005, she stood as the Labour parliamentary candidate in Chesham and Amersham at the 2005 general election.

In 2008, she served on a UK government Foreign and Commonwealth "Understanding Islam" delegation to Bangladesh.

In 2010, Huq was one of three Labour candidates standing for a council seat in Walpole in the constituency of Ealing.

In November 2013, Huq was chosen by Labour as their prospective parliamentary candidate for Ealing Central and Acton constituency to challenge Conservative MP Angie Bray at the 2015 general election. In January 2015, she was one of 15 Labour candidates each given financial support of £10,000 by Lord Matthew Oakeshott, the former Liberal Democrat. During the election campaign, Huq was manhandled by the former vice-chairman of the local Conservative branch, Karim Sacoor, who was caught on video repeatedly attempting to drag her away from Boris Johnson, who was campaigning with her Conservative rival Angie Bray.

Parliamentary career
In May 2015, Huq won the Ealing Central and Acton seat with a 274 majority. Huq won 22,002 votes, previous incumbent Angie Bray received 21,728 votes, with a turnout of 71.4%.

In April 2017, the Green Party decided not to contest her seat in the general election, commenting, "By and large we quite like Rupa. She has made quite prominent statements on proportional representation and Heathrow, as well as climate change and environmental issues in regards to Brexit." In May 2017, Vince Cable commented how he gave Huq a lift home from a joint speaking engagement, saying, "We talked for a couple of hours, and it was very clear that on almost every issue our views were almost identical. And so I would find it difficult to vote against somebody like that, and I hope that our people around the country are discriminating and think and act in a constructive way." In June 2017, in the general election, Huq retained her seat with an increased majority of 13,807.

Positions
Huq was appointed vice chair of the All-Party Parliamentary Music Group and All-Party Parliamentary on Crossrail. She chairs the All-Party Parliamentary Group on London, with specific reference to planning and the built environment. Since her election, Huq has been a member of the Justice Select Committee.

In October 2016, Huq was appointed as a member of the Shadow Home Affairs team in the Labour Party's frontbench in Parliament. She is Shadow Home Office Minister for Crime Prevention. Huq led from the frontbench on the bill before the House of Commons to equalise Civil Partnerships to include heterosexual couples. On 22 June 2020 Huq joined the Panel of Chairs.

She has been a member of the Commons Digital, Culture, Media and Sport Committee since March 2022.

Political views

Labour Party
In June 2015, she was one of 36 Labour MPs to nominate Jeremy Corbyn as a candidate in the Labour leadership election, although she later supported Yvette Cooper.

She supported Owen Smith in his unsuccessful attempt to replace Jeremy Corbyn in the 2016 Labour Party leadership election.

She nominated Keir Starmer as a candidate in the 2020 Labour leadership election.

Racial issues
In April 2016, Huq defended suspended Labour MP Naz Shah during an interview on BBC's Today programme by comparing "alleged anti-Semitic" posts about Israel shared by Shah on social media to a photo Huq shared of Boris Johnson on a zip-wire next to Barack Obama. She also stressed the fact that Shah's comments were made before she became an MP and that some online comments should not be taken seriously. Subsequently, Huq was accused of "trivialising racism". Huq later apologised, saying she was not "fully aware" of Shah's comments before defending her.

In April 2016, Huq claimed that some areas of television had yet to move forward from the racially insensitive sitcoms of the 1970s. She specifically criticised the BBC comedy Citizen Khans "Islamophobic" depiction of a "quite backward" family of Muslims. The BBC responded that "We've also had positive comments from members of the Muslim community for the show and for creator Adil Ray who, like the family portrayed, is a British Pakistani Muslim. As with all sitcoms the characters are comic creations and not meant to be representative of the community as a whole".

In March 2018, Huq received a suspicious package containing an anti-Islamic letter and sticky liquid. The substance was later found to be harmless. Similar packages were received by fellow Labour MPs Mohammad Yasin, Rushanara Ali and Afzal Khan.

In May 2018, Huq told colleagues in Westminster Hall that BAME MPs regularly have their access to the House of Commons estate questioned. She said: "I have been stopped more times in this place since my election in 2015, than in 43 years outside." Furthermore, Huq and fellow Labour MP Tulip Siddiq are mistaken for one another, though they do not look alike. Huq added: "I imagine most BME MPs have encountered it in some form or other."

In June 2019, Huq was the subject of formal complaints to the Labour Party by two former employees for alleged anti-Semitic behaviour. The Jewish Labour Movement called for her to have the party whip suspended in consequence. The allegations were dismissed due to insufficient evidence. Huq had resigned from Labour Friends of Israel shortly before the allegations were made.

Suspension from the Labour Party
In September 2022, Huq was accused of making racist comments during a speech at a Labour Party fringe event running parallel to the party conference. Huq said of the Chancellor of the Exchequer Kwasi Kwarteng, who is black and a member of the Conservative Party, "Superficially he is a black man… if you hear him on the Today Programme, you wouldn’t know he is black". In response, figures within the Conservative Party including its Chairman demanded the whip be removed from Huq and her expulsion from the Labour Party. 

Labour's Deputy Leader Angela Rayner called on Huq to apologise, describing her comments as "unacceptable". Sadiq Khan, the Labour Mayor of London and a friend of Huq, also criticised her statement, saying "What it infers [implies] is that all black people speak a certain way and all black people are working class. Rupa is not racist but that comment was". Huq was suspended from the Labour Party for her comments on 27 September. Huq went on to tweet an apology, but the suspension still remained in place. Huq regained the whip on 3 March, in a statement she gave shortly after Huq re-iterated her apology and stated that she had undertaken and completed anti-racism and bias training.

Brexit
In May 2017, Huq said "I am an MP who is a resolute Remainer ... I will continue to fight for the UK to stay in the EU and vote accordingly. For me this is respecting the will of the people in Ealing, Acton and Chiswick."

In April 2018, while writing for Business Insider Huq said, Brexit is "not carved into concrete, untouchable and unchangeable" arguing that "If the cost of Brexit reaches a point where the British people decide it's not worth it, then they're perfectly entitled to change their minds about whether it's the right path."

In December 2018, she accused UK Prime Minister Theresa May of having "a sort of premature parliamentary ejaculation – that has put the lie to the claim that she sticks to her guns" over her decision to delay a parliamentary vote on the government's Brexit deal. May responded, "I think she will see that I am not capable of a parliamentary ejaculation", which was followed by raucous laughter in the House of Commons.

Politics teaching
In January 2018, Huq said that the A Level history syllabus was biased against Labour because it omitted the 1945–51 Labour government, ends just before Tony Blair's Labour government in 1997 and asks pupils to list Conservative strengths and Labour weaknesses. In February, in a personal film for the Daily Politics series, Huq said it was "dangerous to deny that these things Blair–Brown administrations, or the post-war Labour government which brought in the welfare state and National Health Service ever happened" and she argued there was a pro-Conservative bias to what was being taught with a risk of "brainwashing our kids".

Personal life
Huq married in 2003 and has a son, born in 2004. Her elder sister is an architect, and her younger sister is former Blue Peter presenter Konnie Huq; her brother-in-law is Konnie Huq's husband, the satirist and screenwriter Charlie Brooker.

Her father died on 5 September 2014, and her mother on 21 May 2017.

Huq speaks English, Bengali, French and Hindi.

Books

See also
 British Bangladeshi
 List of British Bangladeshis
 List of English writers
 List of Muslim writers and poets
 List of ethnic minority politicians in the United Kingdom

References

Further reading 
 Rupa Huq on Economic and Social Research Council
 A week in the life of...Rupa Huq
 Huq, Rupa. From the margins to mainstream? Representations of British Asian youth musical cultural expression from bhangra to Asian underground music. February 2003
 Burgin, Paul. Interview with Rupa Huq. SoundCloud. March 2012

External links

 
 
 
 Rupa Huq on guardian.com
 Rupa Huq on New Statesman
 Rupa Huq on Tribune
 Rupa Huq on The Huffington Post
 

1972 births
Living people
People educated at Notting Hill & Ealing High School
Alumni of Newnham College, Cambridge
Alumni of the University of East London
Marc Bloch University alumni
English Muslims
English people of Bangladeshi descent
English sociologists
Muslim writers
English women non-fiction writers
British Asian writers
21st-century English women writers
English journalists
English columnists
American women columnists
Online journalists
Labour Party (UK) MPs for English constituencies
Female members of the Parliament of the United Kingdom for English constituencies
Independent members of the House of Commons of the United Kingdom
British politicians of Bangladeshi descent
21st-century British women politicians
English DJs
The Guardian journalists
HuffPost writers and columnists
Writers from London
Journalists from London
People from Hammersmith
People from Ealing
Academics of the Victoria University of Manchester
Academics of Kingston University
UK MPs 2015–2017
UK MPs 2017–2019
UK MPs 2019–present